Batraz Olegovich Gurtsiyev (born 12 December 1998) is a Russian football player who plays for FC Alania Vladikavkaz on loan from FC Orenburg. He is most often deployed as right midfielder, and is also used in other positions such as centre-forward or winger. He is a South Ossetia international.

Club career
He made his debut in the Russian Football National League for FC Alania Vladikavkaz on 1 August 2020 in a game against FC SKA-Khabarovsk, as a starter.

On 8 July 2022, Gurtsiyev signed with Russian Premier League club FC Orenburg. He made his RPL debut for Orenburg on 23 July 2022 against FC Ural Yekaterinburg. On 28 January 2023, Gurtsiyev returned to FC Alania Vladikavkaz on loan with an option to buy.

Career statistics

Club

References

External links
 
 Profile by Russian Football National League
 

1998 births
Sportspeople from Vladikavkaz
Living people
Russian footballers
Association football forwards
FC Krasnodar players
FC Spartak Vladikavkaz players
FC Chayka Peschanokopskoye players
FC Orenburg players
Russian Second League players
Russian First League players
Russian Premier League players